This is a non-exhaustive list of football clubs in Equatorial Guinea, which is ordered according to the division they currently play in.

For a complete list see :Category:Football clubs in Equatorial Guinea

Primera División (2014)

Región Continental

Región Insular

Segunda División (2014)

Group A

Group B

Women's clubs 

 Malabo Kings F.C.

Rest of the Country

Disbanded or not currently playing
Café Band Sportif
Renacimiento

Equatorial Guinea
 
Equatorial Guinea sport-related lists
Lists of organisations based in Equatorial Guinea